Fort Clark Trading Post State Historic Site was once the home to a Mandan and later an Arikara settlement. Over the course of its history it also had two factories (trading posts). Today only archeological remains survive at the site located eight miles west of Washburn, North Dakota, United States.

History
In 1822, the Mandan tribe built a settlement with earth-covered lodges on the bluffs of the Missouri River. In 1830, a representative of the American Fur Company built Fort Clark Trading Post south of the village. The first steamboat to journey up the upper-Missouri River was the Yellowstone which arrived in 1832 carrying 1,500 gallons of goods and liquor. George Catlin visited in 1832, and Karl Bodmer and Prince Maximilian of Wied-Neuwied stayed the winter of 1833-1834. In 1837, the steamboat St. Peters docked at the village carrying passengers infected with smallpox, and sparking the 1837 Great Plains smallpox epidemic. As the disease swept through the village, it wiped out approximately ninety percent of the inhabitants. In 1838, the nearby Arikara tribe moved into the abandoned village. In 1850, another trading post was built by Charles Primeau. In 1851, a cholera outbreak occurred and then a smallpox outbreak in 1856. When an attack by the Dakota happened in 1861, the fort was permanently abandoned.

Historic site
Most of the site has been owned by the state since 1889.

More than 2,200 features on the surface from the ruins of houses and graves still exist. Lodge depressions are also visible along with an unmarked cemetery with more than 800 graves. The site is operated by the North Dakota State Historical Society.

See also
Knife River Indian Villages National Historic Site

External links
 Fort Clark Trading Post website

References

Archaeological sites on the National Register of Historic Places in North Dakota
Clark
Pre-statehood history of North Dakota
Protected areas of Mercer County, North Dakota
North Dakota State Historic Sites
Trading posts in the United States
Historic districts on the National Register of Historic Places in North Dakota
National Register of Historic Places in Mercer County, North Dakota
American Fur Company
1830 establishments in the United States
Forts along the Missouri River
Mandan, Hidatsa, and Arikara Nation